Greenwich Parks Constabulary was a small police force which policed the parks in the London Borough of Greenwich, England. It was disbanded in 2001.

Footnotes

Park police forces of London
 
Defunct park police forces of the United Kingdom
Defunct organisations based in London